Chantelle Lourdes Mariona Maniti (born January 3, 2005) is a footballer who plays as a defender for FNSW Institute. Born in Australia, she represents the Philippines women's national team.

Early life
Maniti was born in Wetherill Park, the third of four children to Filipino and El Salvadoran parents.

Career

Youth
Maniti started playing football when she was six years old. She had her youth football at Wetherill Park Westerners, Sydney United, and Football New South Wales Institute, her current club.

International career
Maniti was born in Australia to a Filipino father and an El Salvadoran mother, which made her eligible to represent Australia, Philippines, and El Salvador at international level.

Philippines U18
Maniti was included in the 27-player line up of the Philippines U18 for the 2022 AFF U-18 Women's Championship in Palembang, Indonesia.

Maniti was named as captain in her debut for Philippines U18 in a 4–0 defeat against Australia U18.

Philippines
Maniti was included in the Philippines squad for a month-long training camp in Australia. The training camp was part of the national team's preparation for the 2021 Southeast Asian Games held in Hanoi, Vietnam.

She made her debut for the Philippines in a 7–2 win against Fiji, coming in as a substitute replacing Jessica Miclat in the 81st minute.

Personal life
Maniti's older brother Jacob, is also a footballer and a current Philippines U23 player.

Honours

International

Philippines
Southeast Asian Games third place: 2021
AFF Women's Championship: 2022

References

Living people
2005 births
Citizens of the Philippines through descent
Filipino women's footballers
Philippines women's international footballers
Australian women's soccer players
Filipino people of Salvadoran descent
Australian people of Filipino descent
Australian people of Salvadoran descent
Women's association football defenders
Southeast Asian Games bronze medalists for the Philippines
Southeast Asian Games medalists in football
Competitors at the 2021 Southeast Asian Games